John Alsop King (January 3, 1788July 7, 1867) was an American politician who was Governor of New York from 1857 to 1858.

Life
John Alsop King was born in the area now encompassed by New York City on January 3, 1788, to U.S. Senator Rufus King (1755–1827) and Mary (née Alsop) King. His maternal grandparents were John Alsop (1724–1794), a prominent merchant and Mary Frogat (1744–1772). John A. King was part of the King family of Massachusetts and New York through his mother.

He had four younger brothers, including Charles King (1789–1867), who was President of Columbia University, and Congressman James G. King (1791–1853), Edward King (1795–1836) and Frederic Gore King (1802–1829).

When his father was appointed the U.S. ambassador to Great Britain, the family moved to Britain, and King was educated at Harrow School. Upon graduating from Harrow, King returned to New York City to study law. He was admitted to the bar and practiced in New York City.

Career
John King's law career was interrupted by a stint in the military; he served as a cavalry lieutenant in the War of 1812. After the war, however, he returned to his law practice and then ventured into politics. King was a member of the New York State Assembly (Queens Co.) in 1819, 1820 and 1820–21; of the New York State Senate (First D.) in 1823; and again of the State Assembly in 1832, 1838 and 1840.

He was president of the New York State Agricultural Society in 1849.

United States Congress
King was elected as a Whig to the 31st United States Congress, holding office from March 4, 1849, to March 3, 1851. His term as Governor of New York from 1857 to 1858 was noted for improvements to the State's education system and the enlargement of the Erie Canal.

Governor of New York 
Following a series of attacks (the so-called Quarantine War of 1858) on the quarantine facility on Staten Island, King dispatched several units of the New York State Militia to briefly occupy the island.

Presidential Elector 
In the 1860 presidential election, when the Republicans won New York, King was elected a presidential elector and voted for Abraham Lincoln and Hannibal Hamlin.

Personal life
He was married to Mary Ray (1790–1873), daughter of Cornelius and Elizabeth Elmendorf Ray. Together, John and Mary had:

 Mary King (1810–1894), who married Phineas Miller Nightingale (1803–1873)
 Charles Ray King (1813–1901), who married Hannah Wharton Fisher (1816–1870) in 1839. After her death, he married her sister, Nancy Wharton Fisher (1826–1905) in 1872.
 Elizabeth Ray King (1815–1900), who married Henry Bell Van Rensselaer (1810–1864), a United States Congressman and member of the Van Rensselaer family.
 John Alsop King Jr. (1817–1900), a State Senator who married Mary Colden Rhinelander (1818–1894), granddaughter of Josiah Ogden Hoffman (1766–1837)
 Caroline King (1820–1900), who married her first cousin, James Gore King, Jr. (1819–1867), son of James G. King
 Richard King (1822–1891), who married Elizabeth Lewis (1822–1891), daughter of Mordecai Lewis in 1839
 Cornelia King (1824–1897)
 Ellen King (1825–1827)

King died on July 7, 1867, in Queens County, New York.

References
Notes

Sources

National Governors Association biography
Finding Aid to the John A. King Letters, 1825–1883, New York State Library

External links 

 The John Alsop King Papers at the New-York Historical Society.

Further reading

1788 births
1867 deaths
People educated at Harrow School
Republican Party governors of New York (state)
Republican Party New York (state) state senators
Republican Party members of the New York State Assembly
Gracie-King family
Whig Party members of the United States House of Representatives from New York (state)
19th-century American politicians
Presidents of the Saint Nicholas Society of the City of New York
1860 United States presidential electors
Alsop family
Winthrop family